Beware Passage is a strait or channel in the Central Coast region of British Columbia, Canada, between Harbledown (SE) and Turnour Islands.  It was named in 1860 by Captain Pender.

The passage's waters and shores have various Indian reserves and communities of the Kwakwaka'wakw:
Coffin Island Indian Reserve No. 3 on Kamano Island
Small Island Indian Reserve No. 4 on Small Island
Aglakumna-la Indian Reserve No. 2 on Klaoitsis Island
Karlukwees Indian Reserve No. 1, which is the location of the Tlowitsis village of Kalugwis (Karlukwees or Qalogwis are other spellings)
Dead Point Indian Reserve No. 5 on the north side of Harbledown Island

References

Straits of British Columbia
Central Coast of British Columbia